Dactylosternum is a genus of water scavenger beetles in the family Hydrophilidae. There are more than 20 described species in Dactylosternum.

Species
These 23 species belong to the genus Dactylosternum:

 Dactylosternum abdominale (Fabricius, 1792)
 Dactylosternum advectum Horn, 1890
 Dactylosternum americanum (Mulsant, 1844)
 Dactylosternum auripes Fauvel, 1883
 Dactylosternum cacti (LeConte, 1855)
 Dactylosternum cayannum (Mulsant, 1844)
 Dactylosternum circumcinctum Fikáek, 2010
 Dactylosternum convexum (Castelnau, 1840)
 Dactylosternum corbetti Balfour-Browne, 1942
 Dactylosternum corporaali
 Dactylosternum cycloides Knisch, 1921
 Dactylosternum dispar (Sharp, 1882)
 Dactylosternum dytiscoides (Fabricius, 1775)
 Dactylosternum flavicorne (Mulsant, 1844)
 Dactylosternum fulgens Orchymont, 1937
 Dactylosternum grouvellei Guillebeau, 1894
 Dactylosternum helleri d'Orchymont, 1925
 Dactylosternum hydrophiloides (MacLeay, 1825)
 Dactylosternum kanakorum Fikáek, 2010
 Dactylosternum montaguei Balfour-Browne, 1939
 Dactylosternum picicorne (Mulsant, 1844)
 Dactylosternum subdepressum (Laporte, 1840)
 Dactylosternum subquadratum (Fairmaire, 1849)

References

Further reading

External links

 

Hydrophilidae
Articles created by Qbugbot